"Forever in Love" is an instrumental by American saxophone player Kenny G that was released as a single in 1992. The song appears on Kenny G's album Breathless, and he both wrote and produced the song. The song topped the US and Canadian adult contemporary charts and won a Grammy Award for Best Instrumental Composition at the 1994 ceremony.

Music video
A music video for the song featuring a couple as children, and also that couple again, as adults, and Kenny G as the performer.

Track listing

Personnel
 Kenny G – soprano saxophone, all other instruments, arrangements 
 Dean Parks – guitars 
 Paulinho da Costa – percussion

Charts

Weekly charts

Year-end charts

Certifications

Release history

References

1990s instrumentals
1992 singles
1992 songs
Arista Records singles
Kenny G songs